Karl Albrecht Schachtschneider (born 11 July 1940, in Hütten bei Gellin, Province of Pomerania, Germany (now Sitno, Szczecinek County, West Pomeranian Voivodeship, Poland) is a Professor Emeritus in Public Law at University of Erlangen in Nuremberg, Germany.

He has been a strong critic of the European Union and recently the Lisbon Treaty.

Publications, work and references 
 Der Rechtsweg zum Bundesverfassungsgericht in Bund-Länder-Streitigkeiten. Juristische Fakultät der Freien Universität Berlin [West]. Teildruck. Berlin [West] 1969, XXX S., S. 119–184 (Dissertation vom 8. Juli 1969).
 Das Sozialprinzip. Zu seiner Stellung im Verfassungssystem des Grundgesetzes. 1974
 Staatsunternehmen und Privatrecht. Kritik der Fiskustheorie, exemplifiziert an § 1 UWG. Walter de Gruyter, Berlin 1986, .
 Res publica res populi. Grundlegung einer Allgemeinen Republiklehre. Ein Beitrag zur Freiheits-, Rechts- und Staatslehre. Duncker und Humblot, Berlin 1994, .
 unter Mitarbeit von Olaf Gast: Sozialistische Schulden nach der Revolution. Kritik der Altschuldenpolitik. Ein Beitrag zur Lehre von Recht und Unrecht, Duncker und Humblot, Berlin 1996.
 mit Wilhelm Hankel, Wilhelm Nölling und Joachim Starbatty: Die Euro-Klage. Warum die Währungsunion scheitern muß. Rowohlt Taschenbuch, Reinbek bei Hamburg 1998, 
 mit Angelika Emmerich-Fritsche: Recht der Vertragsärzte des Sozialgesetzbuches V, 1999
 mit Richard Fuchs: Spenden was uns nicht gehört. Das Transplantationsgesetz und die Verfassungsklage. Rotbuch Verlag, Hamburg 1999, 
 mit Wilhelm Hankel, Wilhelm Nölling, Joachim Starbatty: Die Euro-Illusion. Ist Europa noch zu retten?. Rowohlt Taschenbuch, Reinbek bei Hamburg 2001, 
 unter Mitarbeit von Angelika Emmerich-Fritsche, Dagmar I. Siebold, Peter Wollenschläger: Einführung in das Wirtschaftsverwaltungsrecht. 2001/2002
 mit Wilhelm Hankel und Angelika Emmerich-Fritsche: Revolution der Krankenversicherung. Prinzipien, Thesen und Gesetz. Hansebuch Verlag, Hamburg 2002, .
 mit Beiträgen auch von Wilhelm Hankel, Angelika Emmerich-Fritsche, Andreas G. Scherer, Dagmar I. Siebold, Udo Wartha: Rechtsfragen der Weltwirtschaft. Duncker und Humblot, Berlin 2002, .
 Fallstudien zum Öffentlichen Wirtschaftsrecht. 4. Aufl., Lehrstuhl für öffentliches Recht, Nürnberg 2005.
 Steuerverfassungsrechtliche Probleme der Betriebsaufspaltung und der verdeckten Gewinnausschüttung. Rechtsgrundsätze versus Gerichtspraxis. Duncker und Humblot, Berlin 2004
 Der Anspruch auf materiale Privatisierung. Am Beispiel des staatlichen und kommunalen Vermessungswesens in Bayern. Duncker und Humblot, Berlin 2005, .
 Prinzipien des Rechtsstaates. Duncker und Humblot, Berlin 2006, .
 Freiheit in der Republik. Duncker & Humblot, Berlin 2007, .

External links 
 Quotes on de.wiki
 Private website (de)

References 

1940 births
Living people
German legal scholars
Jurisprudence academics
Academic staff of the University of Erlangen-Nuremberg
People from Szczecinek County
People from the Province of Pomerania